The United Nations Human Settlements Programme (UN-Habitat) is the United Nations programme for human settlements and sustainable urban development. It was established in 1977 as an outcome of the first United Nations Conference on Human Settlements and Sustainable Urban Development (Habitat I) held in Vancouver, Canada, in 1976.  UN-Habitat maintains its headquarters at the United Nations Office at Nairobi, Kenya. It is mandated by the United Nations General Assembly to promote socially and environmentally sustainable towns and cities with the goal of providing adequate shelter for all. It is a member of the United Nations Development Group. The mandate of UN-Habitat derives from the Habitat Agenda, adopted by the United Nations Conference on Human Settlements (Habitat II) in Istanbul, Turkey, in 1996. The twin goals of the Habitat Agenda are adequate shelter for all and the development of sustainable human settlements in an urbanizing world.

Overview

The UN-Habitat mandate is also derived from General Assembly resolution 3327 (XXIX), by which the Assembly established the United Nations Habitat and Human Settlements Foundation; resolution 32/162, by which the Assembly established the United Nations Centre for Human Settlements (Habitat); and resolution 56/206, by which the Assembly transformed the Commission on Human Settlements and the United Nations Centre for Human Settlements (Habitat), including the United Nations Habitat and Human Settlements Foundation, into UN-Habitat. The mandate of UN-Habitat is further derived from other internationally agreed development goals, including those contained in the United Nations Millennium Declaration (Assembly resolution 55/2), in particular the target on achieving a significant improvement in the lives of at least 100 million slum-dwellers by 2020; and the target on water and sanitation of the Plan of Implementation of the World Summit on Sustainable Development, which seeks to halve, by 2015, the proportion of people without sustainable access to safe drinking water and basic sanitation. Through Assembly resolution 65/1, Member States committed themselves to continue working towards cities without slums, beyond current targets, by reducing slum populations and improving the lives of slum-dwellers.

Work and projects

UN-Habitat works in more than 70 countries in five continents focusing on seven areas: 
 Urban legislation, land and governance;
 Urban planning and design;
 Urban economy;
 Urban basic services;
 Housing and slum upgrading;
 Risk reduction and rehabilitation;
 Urban research and capacity development.

Governance

The governance structure of the programme is made up of three decision-making bodies: the UN-Habitat Assembly, an executive board and a Committee of Permanent Representatives. Previously, The Governing Council was the decision-making body for the Programme, but it was dissolved following a resolution passed by the UN General Assembly.

The assembly is a universal body composed of the 193 member states of the United Nations and convenes every four years at the Headquarters of UN-Habitat in Nairobi. The first assembly was held in May 2019. The presidency of the first assembly was held by Mexico. Mexico's presidency was represented by Martha Delgado Peralta the Mexican Undersecretary of Multilateral Affairs and Human Rights. 
 
The second decision-making body of the programme is the executive board, which is made up of 36 member states elected by the UN-Habitat Assembly with representatives from every regional groups. The board meets three times annually. The Committee of Permanent Representatives of UN-Habitat (CPR) is composed of all Permanent Representatives accredited to the United Nations Office at Nairobi.

The UN-Habitat secretariat is headed by an executive director nominated by the UN Secretary-General with the approval of the UN General Assembly. The current executive director is Maimunah Mohd Sharif of Malaysia, who was appointed in December 2017. The deputy executive director is Victor Kisob of Cameroon who was appointed by in July 2018.

List of executive directors 
Arcot Ramachandran, India, 1978-1992
Elizabeth Dowdeswell, Canada, 1993-1994
Wally N’Dow, Gambia, 1994-1997
Darshan Johal, Canada, 1997–1998
Klaus Töpfer, Germany, 1998–2000
Anna Tibaijuka, Tanzania, 2000–2010
Joan Clos, Spain, 2010-2018
Maimunah Mohd Sharif, Malaysia, 2018–Present

Before 2002, the title of the head of the programme was director of the United Nations Centre for Human Settlements.

World Urban Forum (WUF)

The World Urban Forum is an international conference dedicated to urban issues, organized by UN-Habitat. It was established by the United Nations to examine one of the most pressing issues facing the world today: rapid urbanization and how to ensure a sustainable urban development. It is organized biennially in the years between the UN-Habitat governing councils.

World Urban Campaign (WUC)
The World Urban Campaign is the world living platform on cities for sharing and learning on initiatives, actions and policies driving positive change towards sustainable urbanization. Coordinated by UN-Habitat, it is a global coalition of public, private and civil society partners seeking to raise the urban agenda. The campaign is UN-Habitat's partners' platform for the preparation of the Third United Nations Conference on Housing and Sustainable Urban Development (Habitat III) held in 2016.

World Habitat Day

The United Nations has designated the first Monday of October every year as World Habitat Day. This is an occasion to reflect on the state of our towns and cities and the basic right of all to adequate shelter. It is also intended to remind the world of its collective responsibility for the future of human habitat.

UN-Habitat Scroll of Honour Award
The UN-Habitat Scroll of Honour Award is an award given by the United Nations Human Settlements Programme in recognition of work carried out in the field of human settlements development. The aim of the award is to honour individuals and institutions instrumental in improving the living conditions in urban centres around the world.

World Habitat Award
The UN-Habitat World Habitat Award is presented in recognition of "projects that provide practical, innovative, solutions to current housing needs, with a particular focus on decent, affordable, adequate and sustainable housing". Established in 1985 by UN-Habitat in partnership with the Building and Social Housing Foundation, each year two awards are presented to recipients at the annual session of the Governing Council of UN-Habitat at the United Nations office in Nairobi. The goal of the award is to identify, celebrate and promote "good practice in housing projects that seek to further affordability and sustainability in housing globally".

United Nations Advisory Committee of Local Authorities 
The United Nations Advisory Committee of Local Authorities (UNACLA) was established in 2000 in line with the UN Habitat Governing Council Resolution 17/18 of 1999 as an advisory body to strengthen the dialogue of the UN System with local authorities in relation to the implementation of the Habitat Agenda. In September 2004, UN-HABITAT established a formal relationship with United Cities and Local Governments, which now chairs UNACLA and holds 10 of its 20 seats. UCLG co-hosts the UNACLA secretariat with UN-Habitat.

Members
 Institute for Housing and Urban Development Studies (IHS)
 International Institute of Social Studies (ISS)

See also

City development index
Habitat I (1976), Habitat II (1996), Habitat III (2016)
Right to housing
Sustainable urbanism
Urbanization

References

External links

BBC News Special Report – Urban Planet

 
Organizations established in 1978
United Nations Development Group
United Nations General Assembly subsidiary organs
Urban geography
United Nations organizations based in Nairobi